Raduše is a dispersed settlement in the City Municipality of Slovenj Gradec in northern Slovenia. The area is part of the traditional region of Styria. The entire municipality is now included in the Carinthia Statistical Region.

Mass grave
Raduše is the site of a mass grave from the period immediately after the Second World War. The Žančani Mass Grave is located in the woods north of the settlement.

References

External links
Raduše at Geopedia

Populated places in the City Municipality of Slovenj Gradec
Slovenj Gradec